Michael or Mike Garcia may refer to:

Michael Garcia (politician) (born 1974), former Colorado legislator
Mike Garcia (politician) (born 1976), Republican representative from California
Michael J. Garcia (born 1961), Associate Justice of the New York Court of Appeals
Mike Garcia (baseball, born 1923) (1923–1986), Major League Baseball pitcher from 1948 to 1961, mainly with the Cleveland Indians
Mike Garcia (baseball, born 1968), Major League Baseball pitcher for the 1999–2000 Pittsburgh Pirates
Michael Garcia (soccer) (born 1977), Australian soccer player

See also
Miguel García (disambiguation)